Century II Performing Arts & Convention Center is a performing arts and convention center in Wichita, Kansas, United States.  It is located between Douglas Street and Waterman Street near the east bank of the Arkansas River in downtown Wichita.  It was listed on the National Register of Historic Places in 2020.

Century II is the largest center for entertainment, consumer shows and meetings in Wichita and is home to four arts organizations - Wichita Symphony Orchestra, Wichita Grand Opera, Music Theatre Wichita, and Music Theatre for Young People.

The facility has almost  of contiguous exhibit space, 20 meeting rooms, a Concert Hall that seats 2,197 people in continental seating, the Mary Jane Teall Theatre that seats 650 people in continental seating, and Convention Hall that seats 4,700 people.

The Performing Arts and Convention Center hosted Miss USA pageants from 1990 to 1993 and Miss Teen USA 1995, as well as the 1989 ABC Masters bowling tournament.

History
The facility was designed by John M. Hickman and opened January 11, 1969 to commemorate the centennial anniversary of Wichita's incorporation in 1870. It was constructed on the site of The Forum, a convention center and exposition hall that opened in 1911.  By the 1960s, The Forum was showing its age and did not have adequate facilities that performances or shows required.

The 1926 Wurlitzer organ from the Paramount Theatre (New York City) was removed prior to that theater's demolition and installed in the Century II Convention Hall. Prior to the demolition of the Paramount Theatre, the organ was acquired by Richard Simonton of Los Angeles. In the 1970s, the organ was moved to the Century II Convention Center in Wichita, Kansas. The organ continues to be used today for concerts and other events.

The building is a low circular structure with a shallow domed roof in the style of Frank Lloyd Wright.  A similar structure is the Marin County Civic Center in California.  John Hickman was an apprentice of Wright's at Taliesin West in the late 1940s.  A quote from the daughter of the architect, Susan Hickman, says that her father felt that the inspiration for the building was the vast fields of wheat (represented by the sand-colored pillars) and the limitless sky (by the pale blue-colored dome).  The lobby encircles the main level with convention hall, exhibition hall and concert hall occupying wedge-shaped areas within the ring.  The stages of the three spaces abut in the building's center.

An additional exhibit hall named for former Wichita City Commissioner and Mayor Bob Brown was added to the original structure in 1986.  The hall contains an additional  of exhibit space with an  lobby.  In 1997, the 303-room Hyatt Regency Wichita hotel was constructed and connected to the center.

Renovations on the concert hall began in August 2010.  Work included painting, installation of new seats, carpeting and draperies and an upgrade of electrical systems.  Crews had a window of just less than two months to work between scheduled events.  In October, the center unveiled the renovated areas along with a new logo.  The logo was unpopular with many area residents and quickly dropped.

Gallery

References

External links 
 
Historical
 History: Century II, The Forum, specialcollections.wichita.edu
 Photos: Century II, "The Forum", "Tractor Row", wichitaphotos.org
Redevelopment Plans
 $400M riverbank proposal that saves Century II & former library (2023) - Wichita Eagle, PDF of Proposal
 $1B Riverfront Legacy Master Plan (2020) - Wichita Eagle

Buildings and structures in Wichita, Kansas
Culture of Wichita, Kansas
Music venues in Kansas
Indoor arenas in Kansas
Tourist attractions in Wichita, Kansas
Performing arts centers in Kansas
1969 establishments in Kansas
Public venues with a theatre organ
Sports venues in Wichita, Kansas
Event venues established in 1969
Sports venues completed in 1969
National Register of Historic Places in Sedgwick County, Kansas